Denis Salagayev (born 20 October 1979) is a Russian snowboarder. He competed in the men's parallel giant slalom event at the 2006 Winter Olympics.

References

External links
 

1979 births
Living people
Russian male snowboarders
Olympic snowboarders of Russia
Snowboarders at the 2006 Winter Olympics
People from Tashtagol
Sportspeople from Kemerovo Oblast
21st-century Russian people